The Macrocephali ("large headed") were an ancient tribe of Africans or Indians who performed artificial cranial deformation.

Their cultural practice of artificially shaping the skulls of their children was mentioned by Hesiod, Hippocrates,  Pomponius Mela, Pliny the Elder, Valerius Flaccus, Xenophon, Strabo, and Eustathius.

References 

Greek legendary creatures
Mythic humanoids